Bay Creek is a stream in the U.S. states of Arkansas and Missouri. It is a tributary of the South Fork Spring River.

Bay Creek has the name of the local Bay family.

See also
List of rivers of Arkansas
List of rivers of Missouri

References

Rivers of Fulton County, Arkansas
Rivers of Howell County, Missouri
Rivers of Missouri
Rivers of Arkansas